Lindsaea, common name necklace fern, is a genus of around 180 species of fern, 15 of which reach Australia. The name is in honour of surgeon John Lindsay of Jamaica. The genus is sometimes spelt Lindsaya.

Species
, the Checklist of Ferns and Lycophytes of the World recognized the following species:

Lindsaea adiantoides J.Sm.
Lindsaea agatii (Brack.) Lehtonen & Tuomisto
Lindsaea angustipinna A.Rojas & Tejero
Lindsaea apoensis Copel.
Lindsaea arcuata Kunze
Lindsaea austrosinica Ching
Lindsaea azurea Christ
Lindsaea bakeri C.Chr.
Lindsaea bifida Mett.
Lindsaea blotiana K.U.Kramer
Lindsaea bolivarensis V.Marcano
Lindsaea bonii Christ
Lindsaea borneensis Hook.
Lindsaea botrychioides A.St.-Hil.
Lindsaea bouillodii Christ 
Lindsaea brachypoda Salomon
Lindsaea brevipes Copel. 
Lindsaea cambodgensis Christ
Lindsaea capillacea Christ
Lindsaea carvifolia K.U.Kramer
Lindsaea chienii Ching
Lindsaea chingii C.Chr.
Lindsaea chrysolepis K.U.Kramer
Lindsaea coarctata K.U.Kramer
Lindsaea coriacea (Alderw.) Fraser-Jenk.
Lindsaea coursii (Tardieu) K.U.Kramer
Lindsaea crispa Baker
Lindsaea cubensis Underw. & Maxon
Lindsaea cultrata (Willd.) Sw.
Lindsaea cultriformis K.U.Kramer
Lindsaea cyclophylla K.U.Kramer
Lindsaea decaryana (C.Chr.) K.U.Kramer
Lindsaea digitata Lehtonen & Tuomisto
Lindsaea dimorpha Bailey
Lindsaea divaricata Klotzsch
Lindsaea divergens Wall. ex Hook. & Grev.
Lindsaea doryphora K.U.Kramer
Lindsaea dubia Spreng.
Lindsaea eberhardtii (Christ) K.U.Kramer
Lindsaea ensifolia Sw.
Lindsaea eximia Copel.
Lindsaea falcata Dryand.
Lindsaea falciformis Hook.
Lindsaea feei C.Chr.
Lindsaea filipendula (Rosenst.) K.U.Kramer
Lindsaea fissa Copel.
Lindsaea francii Rosenst.
Lindsaea fraseri Hook.
Lindsaea fuscopetiolata A.Rojas & Tejero
Lindsaea glandulifera Alderw.
Lindsaea gomphophylla Baker
Lindsaea grandiareolata (Bonap.) K.U.Kramer
Lindsaea gueriniana (Gaudich.) Desv.
Lindsaea guianensis (Aubl.) Dryand.
Lindsaea hainaniana (K.U.Kramer) Lehtonen & Tuomisto
Lindsaea hamiguitanensis Karger & V.B.Amoroso
Lindsaea harveyi Carruth.
Lindsaea hemiacroscopica K.U.Kramer
Lindsaea hemiglossa K.U.Kramer
Lindsaea hemiptera K.U.Kramer
Lindsaea heterophylla Dryand.
Lindsaea hewittii Copel.
Lindsaea imrayana (Hook.) Perez
Lindsaea incisa Prentice
Lindsaea integra Holttum
Lindsaea jamesonioides Baker
Lindsaea jarrettiana K.U.Kramer
Lindsaea javanensis Blume
Lindsaea javitensis H.B.
Lindsaea kalimantanensis K.Iwats. & M.Kato
Lindsaea kawabatae Sa.Kurata
Lindsaea kingii Copel.
Lindsaea lancea (L.) Bedd.
Lindsaea lapeyrousei (Hook.) Baker
Lindsaea latifrons K.U.Kramer
Lindsaea leptophylla Baker
Lindsaea lherminieri Fée
Lindsaea linduensis Cicuzza & M.Kessler
Lindsaea linearis Sw. – screw fern, Australia
Lindsaea lobata Poir.
Lindsaea longifolia Copel.
Lindsaea lucida Blume
Lindsaea macrophylla Kaulf.
Lindsaea malabarica (Bedd.) Baker ex C.Chr.
Lindsaea malayensis Holttum
Lindsaea mazaruniensis Jenm.W.
Lindsaea media R.Br.
Lindsaea meifolia Mett.
Lindsaea merrillii Copel.
Lindsaea mesarum K.U.Kramer
Lindsaea mesoamericana A.Rojas & Tejero
Lindsaea microphylla Sw. – lacy wedge fern, Australia
Lindsaea microstegia Copel.
Lindsaea modesta K.U.Kramer
Lindsaea monocarpa Ros
Lindsaea multisora Alderw.
Lindsaea napaea Alderw.
Lindsaea natunae Baker
Lindsaea nervosa Mett.
Lindsaea novoguineensis S.Y.Dong
Lindsaea oblanceolata Alderw.
Lindsaea obscura Brause
Lindsaea obtusa J.Sm. ex Hook.
Lindsaea orbiculata (Lam.) Mett. ex Kuhn
Lindsaea ovata J.Sm.
Lindsaea ovoidea Fée
Lindsaea oxyphylla Baker
Lindsaea pacifica K.U.Kramer
Lindsaea pallida Klotzsch
Lindsaea papuana Copel.
Lindsaea parallelogramma Alderw.
Lindsaea parkeri (Hook.) Kuhn
Lindsaea pectinata Blume
Lindsaea pellaeiformis Christ
Lindsaea pendula Klotzsch
Lindsaea phassa K.U.Kramer
Lindsaea philippinensis K.U.Kramer
Lindsaea pickeringii (Brack.) Mett.
Lindsaea pleioptera K.U.Kramer
Lindsaea plicata Baker
Lindsaea portoricensis Desv.
Lindsaea pratensis Maxon
Lindsaea prolongata E.Fourn.
Lindsaea protensa C.Chr.
Lindsaea pseudohemiptera (Alderw.) Lehtonen & Tuomisto
Lindsaea pulchella Mett.
Lindsaea pulchra Carruth.
Lindsaea pumila Klotzsch
Lindsaea quadrangularis Raddi
Lindsaea ramosii Copel.
Lindsaea regularis Rosenst.
Lindsaea reniformis Dryand.
Lindsaea repanda Kunze
Lindsaea repens (Bory) Thwaites
Lindsaea rigida J.Sm.
Lindsaea rigidiuscula Lindm.
Lindsaea roemeriana Rosenst.
Lindsaea rosenstockii Brause
Lindsaea rufa K.U.Kramer
Lindsaea sagittata Dryand.
Lindsaea salomonis K.U.Kramer
Lindsaea sarawakensis K.U.Kramer
Lindsaea schizophylla Christ
Lindsaea schomburgkii Klotzsch
Lindsaea seemannii J.Sm.
Lindsaea semilunata C.Chr.
Lindsaea societatis J.W.Moore
Lindsaea sphenomeridopsis K.U.Kramer
Lindsaea spruceana Mett.
Lindsaea stenomeris K.U.Kramer
Lindsaea stricta (Sw.) Dryand.
Lindsaea subalata (K.U.Kramer) A.Rojas & Tejero
Lindsaea subalpina Alderw.
Lindsaea subobscura S.Y.Dong
Lindsaea subtilis K.U.Kramer
Lindsaea surinamensis Posth.
Lindsaea taeniata K.U.Kramer
Lindsaea tenera Dryand.
Lindsaea tenuifolia Blume
Lindsaea tenuis Klotzsch
Lindsaea terrae-reginae K.U.Kramer
Lindsaea tetragona K.U.Kramer
Lindsaea tetraptera K.U.Kramer
Lindsaea trichomanoides Dryand. – New Zealand, Australia
Lindsaea ulei Hieron.
Lindsaea venusta Kaulf. ex Kuhn
Lindsaea versteegii (Christ) Alderw.
Lindsaea vieillardii Mett.
Lindsaea virescens Sw.
Lindsaea vitiensis K.U.Kramer
Lindsaea walkerae Hook.
Lindsaea werneri Rosenst.
Lindsaea yaeyamensis Tagawa

References

External links
Smith's original description of the genus online at Project Gutenberg

Lindsaeaceae
Fern genera